The Toxic Avenger is a 1984 American superhero black comedy splatter film directed by Michael Herz and Lloyd Kaufman (credited as Samuel Weil) and written by Kaufman and Joe Ritter. It is the first installment of The Toxic Avenger franchise. The film was released by Troma Entertainment, known for producing low budget B-movies with campy concepts and gruesome violence. Virtually ignored upon its first release, The Toxic Avenger caught on with filmgoers after a long and successful midnight movie engagement at the Bleecker Street Cinema in Greenwich Village in late 1985. It is now regarded as a cult classic.

The film has generated a media franchise including three film sequels, a stage musical production, a video game and a children's TV cartoon. In 2019, it was announced that Legendary Entertainment would be producing a reboot of the film, with original creators Lloyd Kaufman and Michael Herz of Troma Entertainment serving as producers and Macon Blair serving as writer and director.

Plot
Melvin Ferd Junko III is a weakling who works as a janitor at a health club in the fictional town of Tromaville, New Jersey, where the customers—particularly Bozo, Slug, Wanda and Julie—harass him constantly. His tormentors murder a young boy on a bike with their car and take photos of the carnage afterward. They trick Melvin into wearing a pink tutu and amorously hugging a sheep. He is chased around the health club and out a second story window. He falls into a drum of toxic waste, which sets him on fire. After running down the street, Melvin douses the flames in his bathtub. The chemicals transform him into a hideously deformed mutant with superhuman size and strength.

A group of drug dealers, led by Cigar Face, are trying to buy off a police officer named O'Clancy. When he refuses to accept the money, Cigar Face and his gang prepare to castrate him. Melvin appears and kills the criminals, then leaves a mop on their faces as a calling card. Cigar Face escapes, promising to take revenge. Melvin returns home, but his mother is terrified of him and will not let him in the house, so Melvin, publicly dubbed "The Monster Hero" (also known as "The Toxic Avenger" or "Toxie") and hailed as a hero, builds a makeshift home in the junkyard.

A gang of three men hold up a Mexican restaurant and attack a blind woman named Sara. They kill her guide dog and attempt to rape her, but are stopped by Melvin, who wreaks bloody vengeance on them. Toxie takes Sara back to her home, where they get to know one another and subsequently become romantically involved. Melvin continues to fight crime, including drug dealers and pimps for underage prostitutes, and also takes revenge on the four tormentors who caused his transformation. He attacks Wanda in the health club's sauna and burns her backside on the heater. He later returns to the club, pursues Julie into the basement, and cuts off her hair. He confronts Bozo and Slug after they steal a car, ending in Slug getting thrown out of the moving car and Bozo driving off the side of a cliff, killing him.

As Melvin gives aid to the people in the city, Mayor Belgoody, the leader of Tromaville's extensive crime ring, is terrified of what is happening to his goons. He is worried that it will lead back to him and wants Melvin taken care of. A group of men, led by Cigar Face, surround Melvin with guns. Just before they fire on him, he leaps up to a fire escape, so that they shoot each other.

When Melvin kills a seemingly innocent old woman in a dry cleaning store (she is in fact a leader of an underground human trafficking ring), Belgoody calls in the United States National Guard. Back in his junkyard home, Melvin is horrified at what he has become. He and Sara decide to move away from the city and take a tent into nearby woods. They are eventually discovered, and the Mayor and the National Guard come to kill him, but the people of Tromaville refuse, and Melvin's mother arrives and identifies the mutant as her son. The Mayor's evil ways are revealed, and Melvin proceeds to rip out Belgoody's organs to see if he has "any guts". The Toxic Avenger continues to combat crime in Tromaville.

Cast
 Mitch Cohen as Melvin Ferd Junko III/The Toxic Avenger
 Kenneth Kessler as The Voice of Melvin Ferd Junko III/The Toxic Avenger
 Mark Torgl as Melvin Ferd Junko III
 Andree Maranda as Sara
 Pat Ryan Jr. as Mayor Peter Belgoody Goldberg
 Sarabel Levinson as Mrs. Ferd Junko
 Dan Snow as "Cigar Face"
 Dick Martinsen as Officer O'Clancy
 Gary Schneider as "Bozo"
 Robert Prichard as "Slug"
 Jennifer Babtist as Wanda
 Cindy Manion as Julie
 Chris Liano as Walter Harris
 David N. Weiss as Chief of Police
 Doug Isbecque as "Knuckles"
 Charles Lee, Jr. as "Nipples"
 Pat Kilpatrick as Leroy
 Larry Sulton as Frank
 Michael Russo as Rico
 Al Pia as Tom Wrightson
 Dennis Souder as Drug Dealer
 Steven J. Zmed as Gaseous Maximus, The Human Trash Can
 Xavier Barquet as Man Shot In Restaurant
 Reuben Guss as Dr. Snodburger
 Matt Klan as Boy Hero
 Dominick J. Calvitto as Skippy, Boy On Bicycle
 Rick Hochman as "The Hoch"
 Marisa Tomei (Director's cut) as Girl In Locker Room

Production
The Toxic Avenger was the film that "built the house of Troma", and was Troma's first horror film. Previously the production company focused on sex comedies such as Cry Uncle! and Squeeze Play!. Subsequently, Troma focused almost exclusively on horror films.

In 1975, Lloyd Kaufman had the idea to shoot a horror film involving a health club while serving as the pre-production supervisor on the set of Rocky. At the Cannes Film Festival, Kaufman had read an article that said horror films were no longer popular, so Kaufman claims that he decided to produce his own version of the horror film. The film's final outcome was less a bona fide horror film and more of a campy superhero-spoof with extreme violence embedded throughout. The setting of the movie in a health club and the movie was given a working title of Health Club Horror.

Filming
Principal photography for The Toxic Avenger took place at various locations in New Jersey, including Jersey City, Boonton, Paramus, Harrison, and Rutherford during the summer of 1983. Filming also took place in Depew Park and several surrounding streets in Peekskill, New York.  Filming was later reported to be completed in 1983.

The car chase scene was inspired by the final truck scene in George Miller's film Mad Max 2.

Release

Home media
The Toxic Avenger was released by Troma on VHS and Betamax in 1986, and for the first time on DVD on March 25, 1998. It was later re-released by Troma on November 20, 2000 and again on September 3, 2002; with the latter release of the film being a part of a 4-Disk Toxic Avenger movie pack. The film was later picked up for distribution by Prism, who later released the film on February 2, 2004. Troma later released a 21st Anniversary Edition version of the film on March 29, 2005. On March 7, 2006; the film was released by Koch Entertainment. The film would not receive another home media release until Troma released a "Japanese Cut" of the film on December 11, 2012. Troma would release the film for the first time on Blu-ray on August 12, 2014. On November 18, later that year, it was again released on Blu-ray by Import Vendor.

Reception

Critical response
On review aggregator Rotten Tomatoes, The Toxic Avenger holds an approval rating of 70%, based on 20 reviews, and an average rating of 5.5/10. Its consensus reads, "A silly and ribald superhero spoof, Toxic Avenger's uninhibited humor hits more than it misses." On Metacritic, the film has a weighted average score of 42 out of 100, based on 8 critics, indicating "Mixed or average reviews".

Author and film critic Leonard Maltin awarded the film 2.5 out of 4 stars, calling the film, "A funny spoof... Not without violence and gore but still entertaining." Stephen Holden of The New York Times rated the film a score of 3/5, complimenting the film for its "maniacally farcical sense of humor", while also noting that the film itself was trash.

TV Guide gave the film a negative 1/5 stars, writing "Though it is silly, sleazy, and graphically violent, The Toxic Avenger does hold a bit of warped charm for fans of this sort of thing." Keith Phipps from The A.V. Club was highly critical of the film, writing, "As for the movie itself, it's still a piece of trash, if a marginally entertaining one: It's too self-consciously parodic to be good kitsch, and too gross to be all that fun." In his book Comedy-Horror Films: A Chronological History, 1914-2008, Bruce G. Hallenbeck described the film as "disgusting, sick, vile, poorly acted and sloppily produced." He challenged the interpretation of the film as a parody, arguing that the mean-spirited tone of its extreme gore and offensiveness makes clear that the filmmakers were simply trying to appeal to the lowest common denominator.

Reboot

According to Kaufman, due to the remake of Mother's Day, major motion picture companies were interested in doing remakes of other Troma films. Among the titles that were in negotiations was The Toxic Avenger. On April 6, 2010, a remake of The Toxic Avenger was announced.

The remake, once claimed to be aiming for a family-friendly PG-13 release similar to the Toxic Crusaders television series, was to be co-written and directed by Steve Pink. In May 2013, Arnold Schwarzenegger entered talks for a role in the film. In late 2013, Schwarzenegger dropped out to work on Terminator Genisys, but, as of February 2015, plans for the remake continued to circulate. On September 12, 2016, Variety reported that Conrad Vernon would direct the film with executive producers Guillermo del Toro, Bob Cooper, Alex Schwartz, Akiva Goldsman, and Greg Lessans. Mike Arnold and Chris Poole were to rewrite the screenplay.

On December 10, 2018, it was announced that Legendary Pictures had the rights to reboot the film, with Kaufman and Herz set to serve as the film's producers. In March 2019, Macon Blair was announced to write and direct the upcoming reboot. In December 2020, Peter Dinklage is set to star. In April 2021, Jacob Tremblay also joined the cast with Taylour Paige, who joined in May 2021. On June 12, 2021 it was announced that Kevin Bacon had joined the film as the villain followed by Julia Davis and Elijah Wood on June 16, 2021 with Jonny Coyne and Sarah Niles on June 17.  In 2022, the completed work was officially rated R for "strong violence and gore, language throughout, sexual references and brief graphic nudity," thus contradicting earlier claims of a PG-13 rating.

References

External links

 
 
 
 
 
 
 
  The Toxic Avenger – at the Troma Entertainment movie database

1984 films
The Toxic Avenger (franchise)
1984 action films
1980s comedy horror films
American action comedy films
American black comedy films
American comedy horror films
American independent films
Fictional mutants
Films directed by Lloyd Kaufman

Films set in New Jersey
Films shot in New Jersey
American splatter films
Troma Entertainment films
1980s superhero films
Superhero horror films
Superhero black comedy films
American films about revenge
American vigilante films
1984 horror films
American parody films
American superhero films
American science fiction action films
American science fiction horror films
American science fiction comedy films
American monster movies
Splatterpunk
1980s monster movies
American action horror films
Parodies of horror
American exploitation films
1984 comedy films
1980s English-language films
1980s American films